Epacris apsleyensis  is a species of flowering plant in the heath family Ericaceae and is endemic to a small area of Tasmania. It is an erect shrub with hairy branchlets, lance-shaped to elliptic leaves and tube-shaped flowers with white petals.

Description
There are a few soft hairs on the upper surface of the leaves but the lower surface is glabrous. The flowers are arranged singly in leaf axils near the tips of the branches and are more or less sessile, with white, egg-shaped bracts near the base. Flowering occurs from January to November.

Taxonomy and naming
Epacris apsleyensis was first formally described in 1986 by Ron Crowden in Papers and Proceedings of the Royal Society of Tasmania based on plant material he collected near Bicheno in 1984. The specific epithet (apsleyensis) refers to the species' habitat near the Apsley River.

Distribution and habitat
This epacris grows in low, open forest near the Apsley River in eastern Tasmania.

Conservation status
Epacris apsleyensis is classified as "endangered" under the Australian Government Environment Protection and Biodiversity Conservation Act 1999 and the Tasmanian Government Threatened Species Protection Act 1995. The main threats to the species include dieback due to the fungus Phytophthora cinnamomi, inappropriate fire regimes, land clearing and weed invasion.

References

apsleyensis
Ericales of Australia
Flora of Tasmania
Plants described in 1986